Diane Franklin (born February 2, 1956) is an American politician. She is a Republican former member of the Missouri House of Representatives, having served from 2011 to 2019.

References

1956 births
21st-century American politicians
21st-century American women politicians
Living people
Republican Party members of the Missouri House of Representatives
People from Camden County, Missouri
Women state legislators in Missouri